Zubin Mehenti is an American sportscaster and radio host. He joined ESPN in 2011 and has served as the anchor for several variations of the channel's flagship program, SportsCenter. Mehenti formerly co-hosted the ESPN Radio morning segment titled Keyshawn, JWill and Zubin.

Early life
Mehenti was born on August 5, 1978, in East Windsor, New Jersey. His parents were immigrants from India, making him a first-generation American. He attended Hightstown High School in Hightstown, New Jersey. Mehenti graduated from Rutgers University with a B.A. in journalism and another B.A. in political science.

Career
After graduating from Rutgers, Mehenti was hired as a producer for Melinda Murphy at New York-based station WPIX-TV. He began his career as a reporter with WMGM-TV in Wildwood, New Jersey as a weekend sportscaster. Mehenti left the east coast in 2001 when he was hired as a weekend sportscaster for WOI-DT in Des Moines, Iowa, a station he remained at until 2005. He then worked at KDVR-TV and KWGN-TV in Denver for six years. 

In 2011, Mehenti was hired to work at ESPN. He has primarily worked as the host or co-host of several iterations of SportsCenter. In August 2020, Mehenti was chosen as a co-host for a ESPN Radio morning program with Keyshawn Johnson and Jay Williams.

Personal life
Mehenti is a fan of the Rutgers Scarlet Knights sports teams. In an interview, he said that Greg Schiano was one of his favorite sportspeople for improving the Rutgers football program and leading the team to five straight bowl game berths. His favorite hobby is running.

References

American television sports announcers
American sports radio personalities
ESPN people
Hightstown High School alumni
People from East Windsor, New Jersey
Rutgers University alumni
1978 births
Living people